Draga is a remote abandoned settlement in the Municipality of Kočevje in southern Slovenia. The area is part of the traditional region of Lower Carniola and is now included in the Southeast Slovenia Statistical Region. Its territory is now part of the village of Borovec pri Kočevski Reki.

References

External links
Draga (Dragarji) on Geopedia
Pre–World War II map of Draga with oeconyms and family names

Former populated places in the Municipality of Kočevje